The 1982 Connecticut Huskies football team represented the University of Connecticut in the 1982 NCAA Division I-AA football season.  The Huskies were led by sixth-year head coach Walt Nadzak, and completed the season with a record of 5–6.

Schedule

References

Connecticut
UConn Huskies football seasons
Yankee Conference football champion seasons
Connecticut Huskies football